"Closer to Me" is a song by English boyband Five. It was released on 22 October 2001 as the second single from their third studio album, Kingsize (2001). The song peaked at  4 on the UK Singles Chart and was Five's final British release, with the band breaking up after doing promotional appearances for it. The video for the song was directed by Max & Dania and features various vintage band footage.

Track listings
UK CD single
 "Closer to Me" (single remix) – 4:29
 "1,2,3,4,5" – 3:40
 "The Heat" – 3:09

UK cassette single
 "Closer to Me" (single remix) – 4:29
 "1,2,3,4,5" – 3:40

European CD single
 "Closer to Me" (single remix) – 4:29
 "Let's Dance" (The Maverick Monkey Mix) – 5:19

Credits and personnel
Credits are taken from the Kingsize album booklet.

Studio
 Mixed at Biffco Studios (Dublin, Ireland)

Personnel

 Richard "Biff" Stannard – writing (as Richard Stannard), production
 Julian Gallagher – writing, production
 Ash Howes – writing, keyboards, programming, recording, mixing
 Martin Harrington – writing, keyboards, programming, additional recording
 Abz Love – writing (as Richard Breen)
 Jason Brown – writing
 Andy Caine – backing vocals
 Sharon Murphy – backing vocals
 Milton McDonald – guitars
 Alvin Sweeney – additional recording

Charts

Weekly charts

Year-end charts

References

2001 singles
2001 songs
Five (band) songs
Music videos directed by Max & Dania
RCA Records singles
Song recordings produced by Richard Stannard (songwriter)
Songs written by Abz Love
Songs written by Ash Howes
Songs written by Jason "J" Brown
Songs written by Julian Gallagher
Songs written by Richard Stannard (songwriter)